Bhima Kali Temple is a temple at Sarahan in Himachal Pradesh in India, dedicated to the mother goddess Bhimakali, presiding deity of the rulers of former Bushahr State. The temple is situated about 180 km from Shimla and it is as holy as 51 Shakti Peethas.

Gallery

References

External links

Of Stones Soaked In History
Bhimamkali info on NIC
Image of Bhimakali temple

Hindu temples in Himachal Pradesh
Buildings and structures in Shimla district